La Copa Junior Nuevos Valores (2017) (Spanish for "The New Values Junior Cup") was a professional wrestling tournament produced and scripted by the Mexican wrestling promotion Consejo Mundial de Lucha Libre (CMLLl; Spanish "World Wrestling Council"). The tournament ran from April 14, 2017 to April 28, 2017 in Arena México in Mexico City, Mexico. CMLL's recurring La Copa Junior tournament featured second, third or fourth generation wrestlers completing against each other. The 2017 version of the La Copa Junior was the ninth tournament held by CMLL.

The format of the 2017 tournament matches the previous tournament, as well as a number of CMLL's other annual tournaments. 16 wrestlers are divided into two groups of eight that wrestle in a torneo cibernetico elimination match on April 14 and April 21, the survivor of each qualifying torneo cibernetico then faces off against each other in the finals on April 28, 2017. On April 28, 2017 Soberano Jr. defeated Sansón to win the tournament.

Production

Background
Starting in 1996 the Mexican professional wrestling promotion Consejo Mundial de Lucha Libre ("World Wrestling Council"; CMLL) held their first ever La Copa Junior tournament. CMLL held the tournament to celebrate the fact that lucha libre in Mexico is often a family tradition, with a large number of second, third, or even fourth generation wrestlers following the footsteps of their relatives. The premise of the tournament is that all participants are second-generation or more, although at times the family relationship is a storylines family relationship and not an actual one. One example of this is Dragón Rojo Jr. being billed as the grandson of Dragón Rojo, when in reality that is simply a storyline created by CMLL. The original La Copa Junior was won by  Héctor Garza.

CMLL would not hold another La Copa Junior until the 2005 tournament (won by Shocker), followed by a 2006 tournament won by Dos Caras Jr. The tournament did not return until 2010 where Dragón Rojo Jr. won the 2010 version. In 2012 third-generation luchador La Sombra won the Junior cup

In 2014, CMLL held two La Copa Junior tournaments, first a tournament on January 1, won by Super Halcón Jr., followed by a VIP tournament, featuring higher card wrestlers than the usual tournaments, which was won by Máximo The semi-regular tournament returned in 2016, won by Esfinge In 2017, Soberano Jr. won the La Copa Junior Nuevos Valores

The 2017 version of the tournament was given the tagline Nuevos Valores, emphasizing that this specific tournament would focus on the "new guys", younger wrestlers who normally wrestle on the low-to-middle part of the show, between matches 1 and 3. CMLL has previously held tournaments to focus on the younger wrestlers such as the Sangre Nueva tournament or "Forjando un Idolo", but this would be the first time CMLL specifically designated the Copa Junior as being strictly for "new guys". Artillero, who competed in Block B was the only wrestler to not fit the "new" mold, as he had been working for CMLL for 17 years at that point, starting in 2005.

Storylines
The tournament featured a number of professional wrestling matches with different wrestlers involved in pre-existing scripted feuds, plots and storylines. Wrestlers were portrayed as either heels (referred to as rudos in Mexico, those that portray the "bad guys") or faces (técnicos in Mexico, the "good guy" characters) as they followed a series of tension-building events, which culminated in a wrestling match or series of matches.

Family relationship

Tournament

Group A

Group B

Results

April 14

April 21

April 28

References

2017 in professional wrestling
2017 in Mexico
CMLL La Copa Junior
April 2017 events in Mexico